Scouting and Guiding in Mali is served by two groups: the Scouts du Mali, potential member of the World Organization of the Scout Movement and the Guides et Scouts Catholiques du Mali, a UIGSE-inspired Roman Catholic organization.

External links
 Guides et Scouts Catholiques du Mali 

Mali